The Hugh Glenn House is a historic house located in The Dalles, Oregon, United States. It is one of the most notable and historically well-preserved Queen Anne-style houses in The Dalles. Hugh Glenn, a prominent architect and businessman in The Dalles, designed and built the house around 1882 and lived there until his death in 1927.

The house was added to the National Register of Historic Places in 1991.

See also
National Register of Historic Places listings in Wasco County, Oregon
Bennett–Williams House
Joseph D. and Margaret Kelly House

References

External links

Houses completed in 1882
National Register of Historic Places in Wasco County, Oregon
Houses on the National Register of Historic Places in Oregon
Houses in The Dalles, Oregon
Queen Anne architecture in Oregon
1882 establishments in Oregon